RV7 may refer to:
 Mandala 7, the seventh mandala of the Rigveda
 Van's Aircraft RV-7, a kit aircraft